Callispa brevipes, is a species of leaf beetle found in Sri Lanka.

Description
Body length is about 3.65 to 4.16 mm. Body oblong. Head blackish. Oval-shaped eyes are yellowish. Antennae light brown and about 1.10 to 1.20mm long. Prothorax is reddish violet and 0.08 to 1.00 long. Anterior margin with a transverse row of punctures. Scutellum pentagonal. Elytra metallic bluish violet. Elytral length is about 2.10 to 2.40mm. There are eight rows of punctures at each elytron base. Very small and brownish hind wings with a total length of about 3.00 mm. Legs are reddish brown. Legs with broad tarsi, and short tibiae.

References 

Cassidinae
Insects of Sri Lanka
Beetles described in 1919